Krbavčići  is a village in Istria County, Croatia. Administratively it belongs to Buzet.

Geography 
It lies at the centre of Istria Peninsula, 24 km from Pazin and 4 km from the centre of the settlement. It is at the border with Slovenia.

Historical population

References

External links 
Home page of Buzet
Home page of Buzet's Tourist Office

Municipalities of Croatia
Populated places in Istria County